Anastassiya Olegovna Pilipenko (née Vinogradova; born 13 September 1986 in Alma-Ata, Kazakh S.S.R.) is a Kazakhstani hurdler. At the 2012 Summer Olympics, she competed in the Women's 100 metres hurdles.

Her mother Elena and her father-coach Oleg are both former sprinters.

Competition record

References

External links
 

1985 births
Living people
Sportspeople from Almaty
Kazakhstani female hurdlers
Olympic athletes of Kazakhstan
Athletes (track and field) at the 2008 Summer Olympics
Athletes (track and field) at the 2012 Summer Olympics
Athletes (track and field) at the 2016 Summer Olympics
Athletes (track and field) at the 2006 Asian Games
Athletes (track and field) at the 2014 Asian Games
Athletes (track and field) at the 2018 Asian Games
World Athletics Championships athletes for Kazakhstan
Kazakhstani people of Russian descent
Asian Games competitors for Kazakhstan
Competitors at the 2005 Summer Universiade
Competitors at the 2007 Summer Universiade